Hugh McGrogan (1 March 1957 – 1998) was a Scottish former footballer who played for Oxford United and Carlisle United. During his spell at Oxford, he played 126 league games. McGrogan died in 1998.

References

External links
Rage Online profile

1957 births
1998 deaths
Scottish footballers
Association football midfielders
Carlisle United F.C. players
Oxford United F.C. players
English Football League players
Sportspeople from Dumbarton
Footballers from West Dunbartonshire